Lanka de Silva (born 29 July 1975) is a former Sri Lankan cricketer who played in three Test matches and 11 One Day Internationals in 1997. He is also the current interim head coach of the Sri Lanka women's national cricket team.

Domestic career
He made his Twenty20 debut on 17 August 2004, for Colombo Cricket Club in the 2004 SLC Twenty20 Tournament.

International career 

He was right-hand wicket-keeper batsman. de Silva is only the tenth player in Sri Lankan cricket history to pass 10,000 runs in first-class cricket after starting his career in 1991/92 season for Kurunegala Youth Cricket Club.

He played three Test for Sri Lanka all against Indian national cricket team when Sri Lanka toured to India in 1997 without any success and lost his place to Romesh Kaluwitharana.

Coaching career 

In 2015, de Silva was named as head coach of Sri Lanka national cricket team replacing Jeevantha Kulatunga along with physio Neha Karnik. In August 2020, he was appointed as the interim head coach of the Sri Lanka women's cricket team replacing Harsha de Silva.

References

External links 

1975 births
Living people
Sri Lanka Test cricketers
Sri Lanka One Day International cricketers
Sri Lankan cricketers
Cricketers at the 1998 Commonwealth Games
Colombo Cricket Club cricketers
Wayamba cricketers
Sri Lankan cricket coaches
Sportspeople from Kurunegala
Commonwealth Games competitors for Sri Lanka
Wicket-keepers